"Let's Lay Together" is a single by R&B group, The Isley Brothers, released on March 19, 1996 for the soundtrack to the 1996 motion picture Don't Be a Menace to South Central While Drinking Your Juice in the Hood as well as the group's 27th album, Mission to Please. The song was written and produced by R. Kelly (who appeared in his music video for "Down Low (Nobody Has to Know)", with Ron Isley, who also appeared as his alter-ego, Mr. Frank Biggs). "Let's Lay Together" charted at number 93 on the Billboard Hot 100 and 24 on the Billboard R&B chart.

Charts

Weekly charts

Year-end charts

References

1995 songs
1996 singles
Island Records singles
T-Neck Records singles
The Isley Brothers songs
Songs written by R. Kelly
Song recordings produced by R. Kelly